Brandon Fricke (born March 22, 1992) is an American soccer player who plays for Greenville Triumph SC in USL League One.  He is the 2020 USL League One defender of the year.

Career

College and amateur
Born in Grimes, Iowa, Fricke played fours years of college soccer at Butler University between 2011 and 2014, also including a red-shirted year in 2010.

While at college, Fricke also appeared for USL PDL club Des Moines Menace from 2010 to 2014.

Professional
On January 20, 2015, Fricke was drafted 83rd overall in the 2015 MLS SuperDraft by Colorado Rapids. Fricke was not signed by Colorado, but joined their United Soccer League affiliate side Charlotte Independence on February 18, 2015.

Fricke played the 2016 and 2017 seasons in Sweden, with two more stints with the Menace.

Fricke joined Lansing Ignite on January 24, 2019, ahead of the inaugural USL League One season.

Lansing Ignite folded following the 2019 season, leading Fricke to sign with Greenville Triumph of USL League One.

References

External links 
 
 Soccerway profile

1992 births
Living people
American soccer players
Butler Bulldogs men's soccer players
Des Moines Menace players
Charlotte Independence players
USL League Two players
USL League One players
USL Championship players
Soccer players from Iowa
Colorado Rapids draft picks
Association football defenders
Lansing Ignite FC players
Greenville Triumph SC players
People from Polk County, Iowa